Winchester Coca-Cola Bottling Works is a historic Coca-Cola bottling plant located at Winchester, Virginia.  It was built in 1940–1941, and is a two-story, reinforced concrete Art Deco style factory faced with brick. The asymmetrical four-bay façade features large plate-glass shop windows on the first floor that allowed the bottling operation to be viewed by the passing public. It has a one-story rear addition built in 1960, and a two-story warehouse added in 1974.  Also on the property is a contributing one-story, brick storage building with a garage facility constructed in 1941. The facility closed in 2006.

It was added to the National Register of Historic Places in 2008.

See also
Charlottesville Coca-Cola Bottling Works

References

External links
 
 

Industrial buildings and structures on the National Register of Historic Places in Virginia
Art Deco architecture in Virginia
Industrial buildings completed in 1941
Buildings and structures in Winchester, Virginia
National Register of Historic Places in Winchester, Virginia
Coca-Cola buildings and structures
Coca-Cola bottlers